Xia Gang (born 1953) is a Chinese film director. A graduate of the 1982 class of the Beijing Film Academy, Xia is a member of the so-called Fifth Generation, though unlike his classmates Tian Zhuangzhuang and Chen Kaige, he did not gain prominence until relatively later, in the late 1980s.

Like his contemporary Huang Jianxin, Xia's works have focused on modern urban relationships and particularly marriage and love. His film Yesterday's Wine (1995) is most indicative of his interest in modernity and relationships, as it details a young woman's maturation in a modern Chinese city.

Selected filmography

As director

References

External links
 
 
 Xia Gang at the Chinese Movie Database

Film directors from Beijing
Beijing Film Academy alumni
1953 births
Living people
Date of birth missing (living people)